The popliteal vein is a vein of the lower limb. It is formed from the anterior tibial vein and the posterior tibial vein. It travels medial to the popliteal artery, and becomes the femoral vein. It drains blood from the leg. It can be assessed using medical ultrasound. It can be affected by popliteal vein entrapment.

Structure 
The popliteal vein is formed by the junction of the venae comitantes of the anterior tibial vein and the posterior tibial vein at the lower border of the popliteus muscle. It travels on the medial side of the popliteal artery. It is superficial to the popliteal artery. As it ascends through the fossa, it crosses behind the popliteal artery so that it comes to lie on its lateral side. It passes through the adductor hiatus (the opening in the adductor magnus muscle) to become the femoral vein.

Tributaries 

The tributaries of the popliteal vein include:
 Veins that correspond to branches given off by the popliteal artery (see popliteal artery).
 the small saphenous vein, which perforates the deep fascia and passes between the two heads of the gastrocnemius muscle to end in the popliteal vein.
 the fibular veins.

Variation 
The popliteal vein may be doubled in up to 35% of people.

Function 
The popliteal vein drains blood from the leg.

Clinical significance 
The popliteal vein can be visualised using medical ultrasound, including Doppler ultrasonography. It may be affected by a thrombus.

Popliteal vein entrapment 
The popliteal vein may become trapped. This reduces the flow of blood out of the leg, causing oedema, pain, and venous ulcers. Entrapment is usually caused by gastrocnemius muscle. Venography (using an x-ray) or magnetic resonance imaging can investigate it. Surgery can be used to remove tissue creating pressure.

Additional images

References 

Veins of the lower limb